Many notable human fatalities have resulted from aviation accidents and incidents.

Those killed as part of a sporting, political or musical group who flew together when the accident took place are usually only listed under the group sections; however, some are also listed as individuals.

Individuals

Musical groups or artists

Political groups

Sporting teams

References

Further reading

 
  1911 aviation necrology

External links
 A detailed list at PlaneCrashInfo.com

aviation accidents
+Fatalities